Ramon Espadaler Parcerisas (born 19 September 1963 in Vic, Catalonia, Spain), is a Spanish politician. He is married with three children.

Early life and education

He gained a BA in geography and history from the University of Barcelona. He also studied political science and sociology at the Autonomous University of Barcelona.

Political career

Espadaler has been a member of the Catalan Parliament from 1992 to the present, except for a period between January 2000 and 2003. During that time, he held two government posts. He was first appointed director general for local government at the Ministry for Governmental Affairs and Institutional Relations. The following year he became minister for the environment, a post he held until 2003.

From 2010 to 2012, he was deputy spokesman for the CiU, Catalonia's current ruling coalition, at Catalonia's Parliament. The CiU was then the main opposition group. He sponsored bills 7/2011 (on financial and tax measures), 9/2011 (on the promotion of business activities), and 5/2012 (on financial, tax, and administrative measures, and setting up of a tax on hotel stays). He had previously served as deputy mayor of Vic (1999-2001), and as deputy mayor of Sant Quirze de Besora, a smaller nearby town (1991-1999).

Espadaler has been a Catalan representative at the Congress of Local and Regional Authorities of the Council of Europe. He has authored a number of history papers, together with articles in the local and national press.

A member of the Democratic Union of Catalonia (UDC) since 1988, Espadaler chairs its national council since 2003. The UDC is a Christian-Democrat party founded in 1931, and the CiU's junior partner. Past party posts include president of the Barcelona Province chapter, secretary for local government affairs at the ruling council, and secretary general of the ruling council in 2001–2002.

References

1963 births
Autonomous University of Barcelona alumni
Catalan government spokespeople
Democratic Union of Catalonia politicians
Interior ministers of Catalonia
Living people
Members of the 12th Parliament of Catalonia
Municipal councillors in the province of Barcelona
People from Vic
University of Barcelona alumni
Members of the 5th Parliament of Catalonia